Valeriy Tsilent (born September 29, 1969) is a Belarusian wrestler. At the 1996 Summer Olympics he won the bronze medal in the men's Greco-Roman Middleweight (74–82 kg) category.

References

Sports Reference

1969 births
Living people
Wrestlers at the 1996 Summer Olympics
Wrestlers at the 2000 Summer Olympics
Belarusian male sport wrestlers
Olympic wrestlers of Belarus
Olympic bronze medalists for Belarus
Olympic medalists in wrestling
Medalists at the 1996 Summer Olympics
20th-century Belarusian people
21st-century Belarusian people